Roberto Rivera (born September 29, 1980) is a Mexican footballer who played as a central defender for Chivas de Guadalajara.

Career
Born in Guadalajara, Rivera began playing football in the youth sides of Toluca (Atlético Mexiquense), Cobras de Ciudad Juárez and Yucatán. In 2005, Rivera joined Chivas, where he would play for its reserve club Chivas Coras in Tepic, Nayarit. He joined Chivas' Primera División A affiliate Tapatío and eventually play once in the Primera División for the parent club. Roberto made his debut with Chivas in the 2005–2006 season. He played in Chivas' game against W Connection in the 2006-2007 CONCACAF Champions' League.

After failing to feature regularly with Chivas' first team, he joined Dorados de Sinaloa in June 2007. However, a few weeks into the season, Rivera suffered a serious knee injury.

References

External links

1980 births
Living people
Footballers from Guadalajara, Jalisco
C.D. Guadalajara footballers
Association football forwards
Mexican footballers